Norihito Isoda (born 6 August 1995) is a Japanese judoka.

He is the bronze medallist of the 2018 Judo Grand Slam Paris in the -66 kg category.

References

External links
 

1995 births
Living people
Japanese male judoka
20th-century Japanese people
21st-century Japanese people